Albert Rasco (July 2, 1925 – February 16, 1989) was a former Republican member of the Pennsylvania House of Representatives. He was first elected on March 11, 1980.

References

Republican Party members of the Pennsylvania House of Representatives
1925 births
1989 deaths
People from Fayette County, Pennsylvania
20th-century American politicians